Holbeck Woodhouse  is a hamlet in the civil parish of Holbeck, in the Bassetlaw district, in the county of Nottinghamshire, England. It is located 6 miles south of Worksop and is about ½ mile south of the village of Holbeck. The hamlet is part of the Welbeck Abbey estate, and was built for the Dukes of Portland.
Woodhouse Hall was the residence of Robert, first Earl of Kingston, who died in 1643.

References

Hamlets in Nottinghamshire
Bassetlaw District